Miguel Marcos Madera (born 8 November 1985), commonly known as Míchel, is a Spanish former professional footballer who played as a central midfielder.

Having been brought through the youth academy of Real Oviedo, he played with the first team of rivals Sporting de Gijón in both the Segunda División and La Liga, before eventually leaving for Premier League club Birmingham City in January 2010.

He spent the second half of 2010–11 on loan at AEK Athens, before returning to Spain for a three-year spell with Getafe. After a year with Maccabi Haifa, he signed for Qarabağ in 2015, with whom he won five consecutive Azerbaijan Premier League titles and two Azerbaijan Cups, as well as playing in UEFA competitions. In 2020, he returned to Spanish football with Segunda División B club Marino Luanco, but retired in mid-season.

Playing career

Sporting Gijón
Born in Lena, Asturias, Míchel emerged through Real Oviedo's youth academy and transferred to Sporting de Gijón for the 2003–04 season. He helped Sporting's under-19 team win the Youth Champions Cup that year, and was named MVP of the final game.

Míchel started his senior career in 2004, with the club's reserves. Subsequently, he progressed to the first team, competing in the Segunda División; he played 24 matches in the 2005–06 campaign and scored one goal, in a 4–0 away win against Gimnàstic de Tarragona.

In 2007–08, Míchel helped the Asturian club return to La Liga after a ten-year absence. He was handed the vice-captaincy for the start of the following season, and made his debut in the top flight on 31 August 2008, playing 90 minutes in a 2–1 home defeat to Getafe. He went on to appear in 30 matches, 24 as a starter, as Sporting avoided relegation on the last matchday.

Birmingham City

Speculation had linked Míchel with Birmingham City, newly promoted to the English Premier League, in the summer of 2009, but the transfer was not completed until 11 January 2010, for a fee of £3 million. The player signed a two-and-a-half-year deal, with an option to extend the contract for a further 12 months. Spanish journalist and Sky Sports pundit Guillem Balagué described him as a good passer of the ball, tactically aware and positionally disciplined, and "not scared of the physical side", comparing him in style to Javier Mascherano, but "with a better range of passing".

Míchel made his first appearance in the Premier League on 27 January, replacing James McFadden in the 73rd minute as Birmingham's 15-game unbeaten run came to an end as they lost 3–0 to Chelsea at Stamford Bridge, and made his home debut three days later, again as a substitute. However, the fitness and what manager Alex McLeish described as "stunning" form of captain Barry Ferguson in central midfield meant that Míchel was restricted to just nine league appearances, and he was made available for loan in the January 2011 transfer window.

In January 2011, Míchel joined Super League Greece club AEK Athens on loan for the remainder of the season. He made his debut in a 2–0 away win against Skoda Xanthi, and on his second appearance, scored a  free kick against Panathinaikos in the seventh minute of stoppage time to take his team through to the semi-finals of the 2010–11 Greek Cup, 4–3 on aggregate. AEK went on to win the competition, but Míchel was an unused substitute in the final.

Getafe
In August 2011, Míchel played his first 45 minutes for Birmingham in over six months, in a 1–0 pre-season friendly defeat of Cork City. He then returned to La Liga with the Madrid-based Getafe for an undisclosed fee. On 6 November he scored his first goal for the club as, despite having only ten players, they came from behind to beat Atlético Madrid 3–2. He himself was sent off once in each of his three seasons: the first two were straight red cards in away defeats to local rivals Rayo Vallecano, and the third was for a second booking in a 4–1 defeat to another team from the capital, Real Madrid. Míchel appeared in 60 competitive games, scoring once, during his three years with Getafe, and was released on 22 August 2014.

Maccabi Haifa
Míchel signed a one-year contract with Israeli Premier League club Maccabi Haifa in September 2014. He made 25 appearances across the campaign, scoring his only goal on 14 December in a 4–0 Haifa derby win at rivals Hapoel.

Qarabağ
Míchel signed a two-year contract with Qarabağ of the Azerbaijan Premier League just ahead of the summer 2015 transfer deadline, and in time to be included in their Europa League squad. He appeared regularly in his first year as Qarabağ won a third consecutive championship, and scored four times in five Azerbaijan Cup tiesincluding a goal in the last minute of extra time to decide the final against Neftchi Bakuas his team completed a double. He played in 40 matches in all competitions to help Qarabağ achieve another double in the 2016–17 season, at the end of which his contract was extended for a further two years.

Míchel played every minute of Qarabağ's six 2017–18 Champions League qualifiers as they became the first team from Azerbaijan to reach the group stage of the competition.

On 7 June 2019, Míchel signed another two-year contract with Qarabağ.

On 17 July 2020, Míchel left Qarabağ by mutual consent.

Marino de Luanco
On 5 October 2020, Míchel came back to Asturias, after agreeing terms with third-tier club Marino de Luanco. He played eight matches in the Segunda División B before, in March 2021, he announced his retirement because of physical issues.

Career statistics

Honours
AEK Athens
Greek Football Cup: 2010–11

Qarabağ
Azerbaijan Premier League: 2015–16, 2016–17, 2017–18, 2018–19, 2019–20
Azerbaijan Cup: 2015–16, 2016–17

References

External links

1985 births
Living people
People from Lena, Asturias
Spanish footballers
Footballers from Asturias
Association football midfielders
La Liga players
Segunda División players
Segunda División B players
Tercera División players
Sporting de Gijón B players
Sporting de Gijón players
Getafe CF footballers
Premier League players
Birmingham City F.C. players
Super League Greece players
AEK Athens F.C. players
Israeli Premier League players
Maccabi Haifa F.C. players
Azerbaijan Premier League players
Qarabağ FK players
Marino de Luanco footballers
Spanish expatriate footballers
Expatriate footballers in England
Expatriate footballers in Greece
Expatriate footballers in Israel
Expatriate footballers in Azerbaijan
Spanish expatriate sportspeople in England
Spanish expatriate sportspeople in Greece
Spanish expatriate sportspeople in Israel
Spanish expatriate sportspeople in Azerbaijan